This list of U.S. cities by American Hispanic and Latino population covers all incorporated cities and Census-designated places with a population over 100,000 and a proportion of Hispanic and Latino residents over 30% in the 50 U.S. states, the District of Columbia, and the territory of Puerto Rico and the population in each city that is either Hispanic or Latino.

The data source for the list is the 2020 United States Census.

Overall, at the time of the 2020 Census, there were 65.3 Million Americans who were Hispanic or Latino, making up 19.5% of the U.S. population. State by state, the highest number of Hispanic Americans could be found in California (15.6 Million), Texas (11.4 Million), Florida (5.7 Million), New York state (4.0 Million), and Puerto Rico (3.3 Million). Meanwhile, the highest proportions of Hispanic Americans were in Puerto Rico (98.9%), New Mexico (47.7%), California (39.4%), Texas (39.3%), and Arizona (30.7%).

Throughout the country, there are 342 cities with a population over 100,000. 47 of them had Hispanic majorities, and in 74 more cities, between 30% and 50% of the population identified as Hispanic. Out of the 47 majority-Hispanic cities, 26 are in California, 9 were in Texas, and 5 were in Puerto Rico. Florida and New Jersey had two each, while New Mexico, Nevada, and Pennsylvania all had one.

In 2020, the largest cities which had a Hispanic majority were San Antonio, Texas (Population 1.43 Million), El Paso, Texas (Population 679 Thousand), Fresno, California (Population 542 Thousand), Miami, Florida (Population 442 Thousand), and Bakersfield, California (Population 403 Thousand).

List

The list below consists of each city (or city-equivalent) in the fifty states, the District of Columbia, and Puerto Rico with a population over 100,000 and a Hispanic proportion over 30% as of the 2020 Census. It includes the city's total population, the number of Hispanic people in the city, and the percentage of people in the city who are Hispanic. The table is initially sorted by the Hispanic proportion of each city but is sortable by any of its columns, as can be found by clicking the table headers.

Municipalities in Puerto Rico have their rows shaded in yellow

Census-Designated Places have their rows shaded in green

See also

 Hispanic and Latino Americans
 List of U.S. states by Hispanic and Latino population
 List of majority-Hispanic or Latino counties in the United States
 List of U.S. cities with large Black populations

References

Hispanic
Hispanic and Latino demographics in the United States
Hispanic